In geometry, the biaugmented triangular prism is one of the Johnson solids. As the name suggests, it can be constructed by augmenting a triangular prism by attaching square pyramids to two of its equatorial faces.

It is related to the augmented triangular prism and the triaugmented triangular prism.

External links
 
 

Johnson solids